The 2023 Ivanovo Oblast gubernatorial election will take place on 10 September 2023, on common election day, coinciding with the Ivanovo Oblast Duma election. Incumbent Governor Stanislav Voskresensky is eligible to run to a second term in office.

Background
Stanislav Voskresensky, then–Deputy Minister of Economic Development of Russia, was appointed acting Governor of Ivanovo Oblast in October 2017, replacing previous first-term incumbent Pavel Konkov, who resigned at his own request. Voskresensky was nominated for the upcoming 2018 gubernatorial election by United Russia, despite not being a member of the party. He won the election with 65.72% of the vote. Despite Voskresensky's convincing victory, United Russia scored only 34.14% in the concurring Ivanovo Oblast Duma election and overall won a narrow 2–seat majority, which reaffirmed the general competitiveness of regional politics.

Candidates
In Ivanovo Oblast candidates for Governor can be nominated only by registered political parties, self-nomination is not possible. However, candidates are not obliged to be members of the nominating party. Candidate for Governor of Ivanovo Oblast should be a Russian citizen and at least 30 years old. Candidates for Governor should not have a foreign citizenship or residence permit. Each candidate in order to be registered is required to collect at least 5% of signatures of members and heads of municipalities. Also gubernatorial candidates present 3 candidacies to the Federation Council and election winner later appoints one of the presented candidates.

Potential
 Viktor Bout (LDPR), convicted arms dealer
 Aleksandr Boykov (CPRF), Member of Ivanovo Oblast Duma (2015–present)
 Roman Lyabikhov (CPRF), Member of State Duma (2020–present)
 Svetlana Protasevich (CPRF), Ivanovo Oblast Duma staffer
 Stanislav Voskresensky (United Russia), incumbent Governor of Ivanovo Oblast (2017–present)

See also
2023 Russian regional elections

References

Ivanovo Oblast
Ivanovo Oblast
Politics of Ivanovo Oblast